Francesc de Paula Burguera i Escrivà (13 July 1928 – 16 October 2015) was a Spanish journalist and politician.

Born in Sueca, Valencia, Burguera served in the Congress of Deputies from 1977 to 1979, representing his hometown district. He was awarded the Creu de Sant Jordi in 1999, and died in 2015.

References

1928 births
2015 deaths
Politicians from the Valencian Community
Members of the constituent Congress of Deputies (Spain)
Spanish journalists